Fernando Bermudez (born February 13, 1969) is a New York City resident who was exonerated in 2009 after being convicted in 1992 of the second-degree murder of a 16-year-old boy in New York City's Greenwich Village. He was sentenced to 23 years to life. His conviction was overturned on appeal by a New York County Supreme Court justice who also ordered Bermudez released, and dismissed the charges with prejudice. Bermudez serves as a guest speaker for the Innocence Project as well as Represent Justice.

History
Fernando Bermudez lost over 18 years in New York State maximum security prisons following his wrongful conviction of murder in the shooting death of Raymond Blount in 1991. Bermudez was proven innocent in late 2009 with help from pro bono attorneys in Washington, D.C., New Jersey and New York (one of which was Mary Ann Di Bari). Bermudez's exoneration makes him the first Latin-American male in NY-state legal history exonerated on “actual innocence” grounds. The sole evidence against him involved mistaken and coerced eyewitness identification by five teenagers, who later recanted their testimony.

Bermudez is married with three children and two grandkids living in North Carolina. In 2012, he completed his bachelor's degree in behavioral science (Summa cum Laude) and helped abolish CT's death penalty with Connecticut legislators. He has also developed a distinguished public speaking career of over 300 lectures at venues including Columbia, Cornell, Yale, Princeton, Dartmouth and Harvard and both New Haven and Hartford Federal District Courts in CT in addition to the U.S. Department of Justice.

Internationally, he has accomplished lecture tours throughout Italy, Germany, Japan and France with the University of Costa Rica marking his academic hiatus upon settling lawsuits against New York State and City of New York in 2017 — but not without extensive media coverage and authorship in several publications from Columbia University's School of Law publishing his essay “Stolen Happiness”  to Pruno, Ramen and a Side of Hope featuring essays by Bermudez and daughter Carissa.

Since 2016, Bermudez and his family have traveled throughout Western Europe, Central America, Australia and Brazil, a Mecca for Jiu-Jitsu training on his birthday and consistent fitness choice with his son until pausing this summer with rank of Second Degree Blue Belt to complete a book and film about his hard won legal fight and adventures as an infamous NYC graffiti artist. His final chapter, The Rib of Revelation, encompasses challenges against PTSD with rebirth in TENTH year of freedom in building generational wealth through real estate while homeschooling his son.

See also
 List of wrongful convictions in the United States

References

Living people
Overturned convictions in the United States
American people wrongfully convicted of murder
1969 births